Natá is a district (distrito) of Coclé Province in Panama. The population according to the 2000 census was 17,811. The district covers a total area of 608 km². The capital lies at the city of Natá.

Administrative divisions
Natá District is divided administratively into the following corregimientos:

Natá de los Caballeros (capital)
Capellanía
El Caño
Guzmán
Las Huacas
Toza

References

Districts of Coclé Province